The Guðmundur and Geirfinnur case concerns the disappearances of Guðmundur Einarsson and Geirfinnur Einarsson in 1974 in Iceland. Six people were convicted of their alleged murders on the basis of confessions (sometimes called the Reykjavik confessions) extracted by the police after intense and lengthy interrogations, despite lacking the bodies of the victims, witnesses, or any forensic evidence.

In later years, most Icelanders believe the six were wrongfully convicted. On 27 September 2018, 44 years after the disappearances of Guðmundur and Geirfinnur, the Supreme Court of Iceland acquitted five of the six original suspects.

Disappearances
He was last seen by a motorist after he nearly fell in front of a vehicle and has not been seen since. Ten months later, on 19 November 1974, Geirfinnur Einarsson, a 32-year-old construction worker unrelated to Guðmundur, received a phone call while at home and drove a short distance to the harbour cafe in Keflavik. He left the keys in the ignition, but failed to return to the car.

Extensive searches around the harbour and coast did not find a body, and, although the police in Iceland are regularly informed of people who disappear in snowstorms without motive, witnesses, forensic evidence, or bodies, a murder inquiry was opened. The Icelandic Police were put under intense public and media pressure to solve these cases.

Investigation and prosecutions
Six suspects, Sævar Ciesielski, Kristján Viðar Viðarsson, Tryggvi Rúnar Leifsson, Albert Klahn Skaftason, Guðjón Skarphéðinsson, and Erla Bolladóttir, eventually signed confessions to murder, even though they had no clear memory of committing the crimes. They had been kept in isolation, interviewed at length under pressure with little contact allowed with their lawyers. They were given drugs (Mogadon, diazepam and chlorpromazine) and subjected to sleep deprivation and water torture, particularly the alleged ringleader, Sævar, who had a fear of water. He also said that the drugs which were supposed to help him sleep had affected his memory.

The suspects said they signed the confessions in order to put an end to their solitary confinement. For example, Erla was held in solitary confinement for 242 days; two were kept under solitary confinement for over 600 days, and one of whom, Tryggvi, for 655 days – the longest solitary confinement outside of the Guantanamo Bay detention camp. Sævar was kept in custody for a total of 1,533 days.

In 1976, Einar Bollason, the chairman of the Icelandic Basketball Federation, sat innocent for 105 days in solitary confinement, along with Magnús Leópoldsson, Valdimar Olsen and Sigurbjörn Eiríksson, after Erla (Einar's half-sister) and other suspects had implicated them in the case.

Sævar, Kristján and Tryggvi were convicted for killing Guðmundur, while Albert was convicted for helping to hide the body. Sævar, Kristján and Guðjón were later convicted for killing Geirfinnur Einarsson, while Erla was convicted of perjury after she implicated her half-brother and others in the disappearance.

Aftermath
In a speech in Alþingi in 1998, then Prime Minister of Iceland, Davíð Oddsson, heavily criticized the investigation and prosecution of the case after the Supreme Court of Iceland ruled that it could not rehear the case. In 2018, it was revealed that Davíð had given Sævar financial support and advice to help him get the case reheard.

After battling cancer, Tryggvi Rúnar died in 2009, while Sævar Ciesielski died after an accident in Denmark in 2011. Kristján Viðar died in March 2021 due to unspecified causes, his family announcing his death on Facebook.

The case was made public in a BBC radio programme in May 2014, which discussed the apparent memory implantation. Professor Gísli Guðjónsson, a former Icelandic detective and internationally renowned expert on suggestibility and false confessions, investigated this case and concluded: "I've worked on miscarriages of justice in many different countries. I've testified in several countries - hundreds of cases I’ve done, big cases. I'd never come across any case where there had been such intense interrogation, so many interrogations and such lengthy solitary confinement. I mean I was absolutely shocked when I saw that."Most Icelanders came to believe the case had been a bad miscarriage of justice, and the BBC described it as "one of the most shocking miscarriages of justice Europe has ever witnessed."

Retrial
In 2013, an official police investigation report was handed to the office of the State Prosecutor. On 24 February 2017, the Interior Ministry's Rehearing Committee concluded that the cases of Sævar Ciesielski, Kristján Viðar Viðarsson, Tryggvi Rúnar Leifsson, Albert Klahn Skaftason, and Guðjón Skarphéðinsson should be reheard by the Supreme Court of Iceland. However, the committee did not recommend a retrial for Erla Bolladóttir's perjury case.

In February 2018, the State Prosecutor requested that the Supreme Court acquit Sævar, Kristján, Tryggvi, Albert, Guðjón and Erla. On 27 September 2018, the Supreme Court acquitted all five men, but did not reverse Erla's conviction.

Media
A documentary directed by Dylan Howitt called Out of Thin Air was released in 2017. The film was aired by the BBC. An Icelandic film called Imagine Murder was being made about the case in 2017. Directed by Egill Örn Egilsson, the film was scheduled to premiere in 2019. Buzzfeed Unsolved covered the case in 2019. Casefile also covered the case in March 2021.

See also
False confessions and forced confessions
List of people who disappeared mysteriously: 1910–1990

References

Further reading
 The Reykjavik Confessions: The Incredible True Story of Iceland’s Most Notorious Murder Case, Simon Cox, BBC Books, 2018.
 Out of Thin Air: A True Story of Impossible Murder in Iceland, Anthony Adeane, Quercus, UK , 2018.

External links
An End To The Never-Ending Nightmare? Article by Snorri Páll Jónsson Úlfhildarson, published in The Reykjavík Grapevine, 15 April 2013.

1970s missing person cases
1974 crimes in Iceland
1974 in Iceland
Crime in Iceland
Male murder victims
Missing person cases in Europe
Murder convictions without a body
Wrongful convictions